Gudrun Thielemann (born 16 January 1926) is a German former actress of stage, film and television. In 1958 she married the actor Günther Schramm.

Selected filmography
 I'm Waiting for You (1952)
 Don't Forget Love (1953)
 Night Nurse Ingeborg (1958)
 Agatha, Stop That Murdering! (1960)
 Life Begins at Eight (1962)
 Kurzer Prozess (1967)

References

Bibliography 
 Goble, Alan. The Complete Index to Literary Sources in Film. Walter de Gruyter, 1999.

External links 
 

1926 births
Living people
German television actresses
German stage actresses
German film actresses
People from Saalfeld